Roy Adair Rhodes (codenamed "Quebec") was a Master Sergeant in the United States Army Signal Corps and was infamous for being blackmailed by the KGB into supplying information to the Soviet Union.

Biography 
Rhodes was born on 11 March 1917 in Oilton, Oklahoma. He defected while working in United States Embassy in Moscow when he got intoxicated and slept with a KGB seductress, who he was later told he had got pregnant. The KGB then used this information to blackmail him into cooperating with them, using threats that this would be told to his wife if he failed to comply. From 1952 to 1957 the KGB used him to obtain information from the National Security Agency and other important United States agencies even after leaving his post in Moscow in 1953. He was caught in relation to the Hollow Nickel Case as information on him was found on a microfilm. He was found guilty on counts of espionage and was given a dishonorable discharge and was sentenced to confinement at hard labor for 5 years. Rhodes died on 5 February 1997 in Pueblo, Colorado at 79 years old.

References

American people convicted of spying for the Soviet Union
1917 births
1997 deaths